Extensor brevis muscle may refer to:

Foot:
extensor digitorum brevis muscle
extensor hallucis brevis muscle
Arm:
extensor carpi radialis brevis muscle
extensor pollicis brevis muscle